The abbreviation SHHS may refer to:

Sacred Heart High School in Hammersmith, London
Sacred Heart High School in Roseville, Michigan, United States
St. Helens High School in St. Helens, Oregon, United States
Science Hill High School in Johnson City, Tennessee, United States
Shadow Hills High School in Indio, California, United States
Shaker Heights High School in Shaker Heights, Ohio, United States
Smiths Hill High School in Wollongong, Australia
Smoky Hill High School in Aurora, Colorado, United States
South Hadley High School in South Hadley, Massachusetts, United States
South Hampstead High School in Camden, London, United Kingdom
South Hills High School (West Covina, California), United States
Strath Haven High School in Wallingford, Pennsylvania, United States
Stuart Hall High School in San Francisco, California, United States
Sunny Hills High School in Fullerton, California, United States
Sweet Home High School (disambiguation)
Sylvan Hills High School in Sherwood, Arkansas, United States